Sunrise Avenue was a Finnish rock band originally formed in 2002 in Helsinki, Finland. In the early days, the band was called Sunrise and the name was changed to Sunrise Avenue in 2003. Their style varies from rock and pop-rock to rock ballads. Sunrise Avenue's best known songs are "Hollywood Hills" (2011), "Fairytale Gone Bad" (2006), "Forever Yours" (2007), "The Whole Story" (2009), "Heal Me" (2007), "Welcome To My Life" (2009), and "Heartbreak Century" (2017). The band has released five studio albums, two live albums, three live DVDs, a best-of album and 21 singles. They are successful and known across continental Europe, especially their home country and Germany as well as some Eastern European countries.

Career
Samu Haber established Sunrise together with Finnish singer-songwriter Jan Hohenthal in April 1992 in Espoo, Finland. They performed at a variety of pubs, small festivals and private parties until 1998, when Haber moved to Spain. The other band members at that time were Sami Heinänen (bass) and Antti Tuomela (drums).

After four years in Spain and only a handful of performances at private Spanish events, Haber moved back to Finland. The band changed the name to Sunrise Avenue in October 2001 in restaurant Memphis in Helsinki at the "Sunrise world domination plan meeting." By that time Tuomela had left the band and the band had no drummer. Bassist Sami Heinänen designed the American Street sign logo for the band after the meeting.

Jan Hohenthal left the band in 2002 as he wanted to focus on his own career. These days Hohenthal plays with his Finnish folk band Metrofolk. Heinänen introduced a new guitarist, his high school friend Janne Kärkkäinen to the band in 2002.

With a new drummer, Juho Sandman, the band performed in many student events, small festivals and in small clubs mostly in the Greater Helsinki area. The guys worked with two Finnish producers (Jone Ullakko and Jani Saastamoinen) before finding their future in-house producer Jukka Backlund. Haber still says Backlund is the "All time musical mentor and teacher for himself and for the band."

Between 2002 and 2005 Haber visited record companies and agencies 102 times in Finland and Sweden before they were finally signed to small Scandinavian label Bonnier Amigo Music. The answer was always the same: "Without black clothes and make-up, rock music can’t succeed."

To finance the debut album On the Way to Wonderland, Haber introduced the "Sunrise Avenue Business Plan" to his friend, a copy machine sales man Mikko Virtala. Virtala financed most of the album’s recordings and a trip to Midem Music Expo in Cannes, France, to meet the European managers and labels. In Cannes Haber met the band’s future manager Bob Cunningham from the UK. On the Way to Wonderland was released in 2006 in most of Europe. Their biggest hit "Fairytale Gone Bad" reached several top positions in radio and single charts in many European countries, and the band performed three sold-out European tours and the biggest European festivals, such as the main stage of Rock am Ring in 2007.

In 2007 the band decided to fire their guitarist Janne Kärkkäinen after a long difficult era. Kärkkäinen filed a lawsuit against the band claiming they had no right to perform as Sunrise Avenue without him. The Band won the court case on the first level court in Finland and after 3 years of legal fight, both parties made a classified financial agreement for the future and all cases were dropped. The band name and the trademark is owned now by the only remaining original band member Samu Haber. 

In 2008 Haber and Backlund bought the Sonic Kitchen Recording Studio in Helsinki together with a Finnish producer Aku Sinivalo. Sunrise Avenue Recorded the second studio album Popgasm at Sonic Kitchen Studios. Haber and Backlund sold their share of the studio in 2010.

In 2010 Sunrise Avenue recorded the acoustic shows on their tour in Germany, Switzerland and Austria, and released the best moments on their Acoustic Tour Live 2010 album in most of Europe.

In 2010 Sunrise Avenue started working with their 3rd studio album together with Backlund and a new producer Jukka Immonen. The songs were written in Helsinki, Los Angeles, Tokyo, Stockholm, Greece and Germany. With two producers in the team, Haber became the band’s executive producer. In the summer of 2010 after negotiating with many Scandinavian major record companies, Sunrise Avenue signed a worldwide deal with Universal Music (excluding Germany, Switzerland, Austria)
Out Of Style has been released in 70 countries and the first single Hollywood Hills has been a major radio and sales hit in many European countries.

2013 Sunrise Avenue released their fourth studio album, Unholy Ground, which was a huge success in Germany, Austria and in Switzerland. So far the album has sold platinum in Germany and in Switzerland, in Austria it has reached the gold limit. "Lifesaver" was the first single and it was a huge radio hit. Unholy Ground was a groundbreaking album and the tour after the release was sold out in several countries with venues up to 12 000 capacities.

2014 Sunrise Avenue released their very first Best Of-album, Fairytales. The album went straight to #1 in the German and Swiss album charts and went platinum in Germany and gold in Switzerland.

In 2016 the band released one single, "Prisoner in Paradise". A new album followed in 2017 titled Heartbreak Century which entered the German album charts at #1 position. The new album spawned two singles namely "Help You Hate Me" and the title track. The new album was also accompanied by a European Tour in late 2017 through mid 2018. In 2018 a further single titled "Dreamer" was released. 

After a quiet 2019, at a press conference in Helsinki, the band announced on 2 December 2019 that they would not continue past 2020. They announced one final single titled “Thank You For Everything” and a small final tour in 2020 with a total of seven locations plus one festival, after which the band will no be longer active. However, on 1 March 2021, they seemingly reunited, announcing new website and new album, alongside new band merch. 

After long waiting Sunrise Avenue started their Farewell Live Concert tour in 2022. Their farewell concert tour started in Finland (Seinäjoki and Helsinki). They also released a documentary called “This Is The End” of the concert held in Helsinki.

Sunrise Avenue´s farewell concert tour continued to Germany in Autumn 2022 (Hannover, Hamburg, Cologne, Leipzig, Stuttgart, Berlin, Munich, Frankfurt and Düsseldorf). The group played their final show in Düsseldorf on 18 September 2022.

Starting from 2020, Sunrise Avenue's head singer and songwriter Samu Haber is continuing his career as a solo artist and mainly singing in Finnish language.

Band members

Final line-up
Samu Aleksi Haber (born 2 April 1976) – vocals, guitar (2002–2022)
Ilkka "Raul" Ruutu (born 28 August 1975) – bass, background vocals (2002–2022)
Sami Tapio Osala (born 10 March 1980) – drums (2005–2022)
Riku Juhani Rajamaa (born 4 November 1975) – lead guitar, background vocals (2007–2022)

Tour members
Osmo Ikonen – keyboards (2009–2022)

Former members
Jan Hohenthal – guitar, vocals (1992–2002)
Sami Heinänen – bass, background vocals (1995–2002)
Teijo Jämsä – drums (2004–2005)
Janne Kärkkäinen – guitar, background vocals (2002–2007)
Juho Sandman – drums, background vocals (2002–2004)
Teijo Jämsä – drums (2004–2006)
Jukka Backlund – keyboards (2005–2008)
Olli Tumelius – drums (2005)
Lenni-Kalle Taipale – (2010)
Heikki Puhakainen – (2011)

Timeline

Discography

Albums
On the Way to Wonderland (2006)
Popgasm (2009)
Acoustic Tour 2010 (2010)
Out of Style (2011)
Out of Style – Live Edition (2012)
Unholy Ground (2013)
Fairytales – Best Of 2006–2014 (2014)
Heartbreak Century (2017)
Live with Wonderland Orchestra (2021)

Awards

References

External links

Interviews:
Interview with Samu Haber of Sunrise Avenue at FreeMagazine.fi
Rockpalast, Underground (Cologne), first gig in Germany (23 August 2006):
Unplugged version of "Fairytale Gone Bad" backstage
KAI3, local TV-station in Düsseldorf (24 October 2006 & 27 February 2007):
Interview and unplugged version of "Heal me" and "Fairytale gone bad"

Musical groups established in 2002
Musical groups disestablished in 2022
Finnish alternative rock groups
2002 establishments in Finland
2022 disestablishments in Finland
English-language singers from Finland